Syed Mehdi Shah is a Pakistani politician who is currently serving as the 8th Governor of Gilgit-Baltistan since 15 August 2022. Previously, he served as the first Chief Minister of Gilgit-Baltistan from 2009 to 2014. He has also served as the President of Gilgit-Baltistan chapter of the Pakistan People's Party.

He contested in 2020 Gilgit-Baltistan Assembly election from the constituency GBA-7 (Skardu-I), but lost to Raja Zakaria Khan Maqpoon.

References

Living people
Balti people
People from Gilgit-Baltistan
Chief Ministers of Gilgit-Baltistan
Pakistan People's Party politicians
Gilgit-Baltistan MLAs 2009–2014
Year of birth missing (living people)